Acronicta raphael is a moth of the family Noctuidae. It is found in the Korean Peninsula, China and the Russian Far East (Primorye, southern Khabarovsk, Amur region).

External links
Korean Insects

Acronicta
Moths described in 1884
Moths of Asia